Bonnett's Energy Corp. is an open-ended investment trust headquartered in Calgary, Alberta serving the oil and gas production and completion services industry in the Western Canadian Sedimentary Basin ("WCSB").

Profile
Bonnett's Energy Services Trust is focused on providing oilfield services through four operating divisions: Wireline Services, including slickline, electric line, and swabbing services; Testing Services, including production testing, frac recovery, Under balanced drilling recovery, well bleed offs, pipeline bleed offs  and related services; Well stimulation, including fracturing, acidizing and nitrogen services; and Fishing and Rentals, including rental of fishing and oilfield equipment, and services to be used on drilling and service rigs.

Corporate governance
Current members of the board of directors of Bonnett's Energy Services Trust are: Murray Toews, Troy Tews and Carrie Lonardelli.

See also
 Oil
 Natural gas 
 Oil well 
 Drilling 
 OPEC 
 List of oil-producing states

References

External links 

Companies formerly listed on the Toronto Stock Exchange
Oil companies of Canada
Natural gas companies of Canada
Energy companies established in 1972
Companies based in Calgary
Oilfield services companies
1972 establishments in Alberta